Lissay-Lochy is a commune in the Cher department in the Centre-Val de Loire region of France.

Geography
The A71 autoroute forms much of the eastern border of the commune.

Population

Sights
 The church of St. Hilaire, dating from the thirteenth century.
 Traces of a Roman villa at Verrieres.

See also
Communes of the Cher department

References

External links

Lissay-Lochy website  

Communes of Cher (department)